Albert Roger Miller (born 20 May 1952), known as Roger Milla, is a Cameroonian former professional footballer who played as a forward. He was one of the first African players to be a major star on the international stage. He played in three World Cups for the Cameroon national team.

He achieved international stardom at 38 years old, an age at which most forwards have retired, by scoring four goals at the 1990 FIFA World Cup and thus becoming the oldest goalscorer in World Cup history. He helped Cameroon become the first African team to reach the World Cup quarter-finals. Four years later, at the age of 42, Milla broke his own record as the oldest goalscorer in World Cup by scoring against Russia in the 1994 FIFA World Cup.

Milla is also remembered for his trademark goal celebration of running to the corner flag and performing a dance. He is fond of the Lambada dance which he usually does in the corner of the soccer field after scoring a goal. In the years that have followed, he has been recognised as a pioneer of the many unconventional and imaginative goal celebrations seen since then. In 2004 he was named by Pelé in the FIFA 100 list of the world's greatest living players. In 2007, the Confederation of African Football named Milla the best African player of the previous 50 years. At the time of his retirement, he was regarded as the all-time topscorer from African region in FIFA World Cup finals with five goals and his record was eventually surpassed by Ghana's Asamoah Gyan.

Biography 
His birth certificate as well as his passport implies his name as Roger Miller due to a clerical error and misunderstanding. His parents wanted to give him the surname of his uncle 'Milla' by the time he was born. He was often referred to as Miller whenever he featured in high-profile international matches with World Cup statistical sheets referring to him as Miller speaks volume of how far his name had been mispronounced and wrongly heard in international community. His family moved to Douala when he was 11.

His father worked on the railroads and Milla had the fortune of travelling all over the nation on many occasions in his childhood. He was raised up in the streets of Yaoundé and he hailed from a typical middle-class family so that his parents were able to provide him a satisfactory education. However, his parents were unhappy when they noticed that Milla was going after football and they were initially reluctant to accept their son playing the sport of football.

He learnt the art of playing football by playing barefoot with fellow kids on dirt streets and roads and in most of the occasions he played with an orange or a tin can as an alternate option for a ball. He also had the habit of kicking lemons and rags tied together into balls. He along with other children had to play in dusty courts since Cameroon had not yet established children soccer academies at that time and Cameroon did not have the luxury of well maintained fields nor did they afford to have licensed coaches. It was revealed that Milla played football solely for leisure, fun and entertainment purposes and did not think seriously of making it as his career and he went onto polish his football skills during school vacations.

It is revealed that people in Cameroon nicknamed him as Pelé with reference to Brazilian football legend Pelé. He considers Nkodo Sitony as his favorite singer. Roger Milla himself said that he had finished high school but his claim has been refuted by some Cameroonian writers. He has three brothers with different surnames such as Joseph Debouba, Jacques Edjanque and Alexandre Diboussi. He nearly quit the sport after his mother's untimely death at home during the time when he played soccer in a distant arena and also due to his wife had become pregnant as the couple were awaiting for their second child.

Club career

Early years
He played for Eclair de Douala's junior team at the age of 13 and engaged exclusively in school tournaments. He later convinced his parents following his impressive performances in age group category matches.

He made his debut for Eclair de Douala's senior team in the second division of the Cameroonian championship at the age of 15. Two years later, aged 17, he became the Cameroonian schools high jump champion. He signed up for the top division club Léopard Douala in 1970 at the age of 18 and eventually went onto win three Cameroonian championship titles with the club. He also scored a tally of 89 goals in 116 appearances for Léopard Douala during a tenure of four years. He subsequently moved to Tonnerre Yaoundé in 1974 four years after the successful stint with Léopard Douala. He won the African Cup Winners' Cup with Tonnerre Yaoundé and for Tonnerre Yaoundé club he scored 69 goals in 87 games.

Moving to France
He moved to France at the age of 25 in 1977 where he spent 12 years of his career playing for various clubs. In 1977, he was lured to Europe by the French club Valenciennes. There he scored 6 goals in 28 league games over two seasons. In 1979, he joined AS Monaco, where he won the 1980 French Cup and scored 5 goals in 25 league and cup games. He had endured multiple injury concerns during his short stay and his team management decided to release him at the end of the season. The next year, he joined Bastia, where he spent four seasons. Milla scored 42 goals in 133 competitive matches and was instrumental in assisting the club to win the 1981 French Cup.

He next moved to Saint-Etienne in 1984 and became a crucial member of the club, which was recovering from the aftermath of a massive bribery scandal in 1982 and the subsequent relegation to Division 2, having had to sell out most of its first-choice players. He overall played 69 matches for the club scoring 36 goals and played a part in helping the club to re-enter the first division. He then starred for Montpellier from 1986 to 1989, where Milla later went on to become a member of the club's coaching staff after retiring from French football.  In his first season, Milla scored 18 goals in 33 regular season matches, which ultimately helped the Montpellier to return to Division 1. Overall, he scored 41 goals in 103 appearances for the Montpellier.

Later years
Milla left French football at the age of 37 in 1989 and moved to Réunion in the Indian Ocean where he played for JS Saint-Pierroise. After his World Cup success, he returned to Tonnerre in Cameroon for four seasons. He closed out his playing days with two clubs in Indonesia after the 1994 World Cup, retiring from the sport at the end of the 1996 season. The number of goals he had scored in the Indonesian local championship surpassed the number of matches he had even played in the competition, with 41 goals coming in just 35 matches over a period of two years.

International career
Milla was capped 77 times for the national team, scoring 43 goals. Milla made his first appearance for Cameroon in 1973 versus Zaire in a World Cup qualifier.

He made his World Cup debut in also what is considered to be the maiden World Cup appearance for Cameroon when they qualified for the 1982 FIFA World Cup after winning both their final round matches against Morocco at the 1982 FIFA World Cup qualification for the African Zone. Milla played an instrumental role in helping Cameroon to qualify for the 1982 World Cup by top scoring in the 1982 FIFA World Cup qualification for the African Zone competition. He endured mixed emotions at 1982 FIFA World Cup having a goal disallowed against Peru in their first match. Cameroon went out with three draws from their three first-round games. Two years later, he was part of the squad competing at the 1984 Summer Olympics in Los Angeles, California.

Milla was also an integral member of the Cameroonian squad which won the 1984 African Cup of Nations where Cameroon defeated Nigeria 3-1 in the final to secure Cameroon's first ever continental title. He was a key member of the Cameroonian side which emerged as runners-up to Egypt in the final of the 1986 African Cup of Nations and he received the best player award in the tournament for being the top goal scorer with 4. He was also named in 1986 African Cup of Nations team of the tournament. He was also the joint top goalscorer in the 1988 African Cup of Nations with 2 goals alongside Algeria's Lakhdar Belloumi, Abdoulaye Traoré of Ivory Coast and Gamal Abdelhamid of Egypt. He once again  played a vital role in Cameroon's trumph at the 1988 African Cup of Nations and for his noteworthy performances throughout the tournament, he was adjudged as the player of the tournament and was also included in the 1988 African Cup of Nations team of the tournament.

In 1988, at the age of 36, Milla celebrated his early retirement from international football with a jubilee in Cameroon. However, in 1990, he received a phone call from the President of Cameroon Paul Biya, who pleaded with him to come out of international retirement and rejoin the national team. He agreed, and went to Italy with the Indomitable Lions for the 1990 World Cup, where he would cause a sensation. It was revealed that Paul Biya personally wanted Milla to play in the World Cup after watching Milla play in an exhibition charity match which was played at Douala where Milla went onto score two goals. Following the insistence of the Cameroonian President, Milla decided to make a comeback return to international football by making an official announcement in May 1990.

It is also reported that most of the Cameroonian teammates and the national head coach Valery Nepomnyashchy who is a Russian did not want Milla to be part of the 1990 FIFA World Cup. Biya issued a decree summoning him to return to the national side and Biya officially signed the decree requesting and compelling the coach to pick him up for the World Cup squad. It was also reported that the renowned sportswriters in Cameroon along with fans began a campaign to recall Milla back to the national team following Cameroon's embarrassing display during the 1990 African Cup of Nations in Algeria where Cameroon crashed out from the group stage with defeats to The Gambia and Senegal.

1990 World Cup
Interestingly, Milla scored all the four goals in the tournament as a substitute as he started every game of the tournament on the bench. He started in the second half in four out of five World Cup matches with only once he appeared in the first half. His two crucial goals came in the second half of the match against Romania within just two minutes in the extra time where he once again appeared as a substitute and following his heroics, he was hailed as a hero in Cameroon. It was the coach Valery Nepomnyashchy who decided to bring in Milla a bit earlier in the game against Romania knowing full well that a victory would secure Cameroon's spot in knockout stages and also the coach later acknowledged the importance of Milla after his important late cameo in Cameroon's remarkable upset victory over defending world champions Argentina. He was the oldest outfield player to feature in the 1990 FIFA World Cup and was the second oldest player during the tournament after England's Peter Shilton.

The 38-year-old Milla emerged as one of the tournament's major stars. He scored four goals in Italy, celebrating each one with a dance around the corner flag that has become a popular goal celebration ever since. Two of his goals came against Romania in Cameroon's second game, and two more came in extra time against Colombia in the last 16 to carry Cameroon to the quarter-finals, the furthest an African team had ever advanced at the World Cup (Senegal and Ghana matched this feat in 2002 and 2010 respectively, whilst Morocco surpassed it by reaching the semi-finals in 2022). In the quarter-final match against England, Milla confirmed his super-sub legend by entering in the second half with Cameroon trailing 1–0 and drawing a penalty and then setting up a goal for Ekeke to give Cameroon a 2–1 lead, before England later scored two penalties, to win 3–2 after extra time. Due to his performances in Italy, he was once again named African Footballer of the Year.

His second goal celebration against Colombia became iconic across the world, and was used by Coca-Cola as seen in ads like the 2010 World Cup Coca-Cola advertisement.

1994 World Cup
Milla returned to the 1994 FIFA World Cup at the age of 42, being the oldest player ever to appear in a World Cup until the 2014 tournament when Colombia's Faryd Mondragón entered in a group stage match versus Japan being 43 years and 3 days old, setting a new record. Mondragon's record in turn was beaten by Essam El Hadary in 2018. Cameroon were knocked out in the group stages; however, Milla scored a goal against Russia, setting a record as the oldest goalscorer in a World Cup tournament, breaking the record he had set in 1990. His final international appearance came in a friendly against South Africa in December 1994.

Post-playing career
He is now an itinerant ambassador for African causes. He also works as a volunteer for various groups including the World Wide Fund for Nature. He also opened two companies for recycling plastic into paving slabs. In 2004, he was named to the FIFA 100, a list of the 125 greatest living footballers selected by Pelé in conjunction with FIFA's centenary celebrations.

He coached Montpellier from 2001 to 2007. He also went onto serve as the manager of the Tonnerre for a tenure of four years between 2007 and 2011.

Legacy 
He was appointed as the honorary president of the Cameroonian Football Federation in March 2008. However, he was removed from the position as honorary president in May 2012 after crtiticising the top officials of the Cameroon Football Federation with regards to the lengthy ban imposed on Samuel Eto'o.

On 24 November 2022, he was honoured by the FIFA for his achievements as the FIFA President Gianni Infantino presented him a plaque just prior to the start of the group stage match between Cameroon and Switzerland during the 2022 FIFA World Cup at Al Janoub Stadium and Milla was also officially invited as a special guest by FIFA President to watch the match.

His wily celebration in a kind of Makossa dance at corner flag area during the 1990 FIFA World Cup changed the perceptions of how people started to see African football in a positive manner. His celebrations were deemed as instant hit and triggered positive energy to the viewers during the World Cup. He became the talk of the town and tournament sensation during the 1990 FIFA World Cup mainly for his skill sets on the field, dance celebrations and for his technique. He was later dubbed as "King of the Corner Flag".

In 2020, he along with the Cameroonian teammates received three bedroom bungalows as gifts in recognition of their stellar run during the 1990 FIFA World Cup. However, they had to wait for 30 years to receive the gift despite early promise by President Paul Biya in 1990. The project was long delayed following the concerns with regards to corruption and malpractices relating to the submitted list of 44 beneficiaries.

Career statistics

Honours
Léopards Douala
Cameroon Première Division: 1971–72, 1972–73, 1973–74

Tonnerre Yaoundé
African Cup Winners' Cup: 1975
Cameroonian Cup: 1991

Monaco
Coupe de France: 1979–80

Bastia
Coupe de France: 1980–81

Montpellier
Division 2: 1986–87

Cameroon
Africa Cup of Nations: 1984, 1988

Individual
African Footballer of the Year: 1976, 1990
Africa Cup of Nations best player: 1986, 1988
Africa Cup of Nations top scorer: 1986, 1988
FIFA World Cup Bronze Boot: 1990
FIFA World Cup All-Star Team: 1990
FIFA 100
CAF Best African Player of the last 50 years: 2007
Golden Foot Legends Award: 2014
IFFHS Legends
World Soccer: The 100 Greatest Footballers of All Time

Orders
Chevalier of the Légion d'honneur: 2006

See also 
 List of men's footballers with 500 or more goals

References

External links

Best African Player in The Past Fifty Years

1952 births
Living people
Footballers from Yaoundé
FIFA 100
Association football forwards
Cameroonian footballers
Cameroonian expatriate footballers
African Footballer of the Year winners
Africa Cup of Nations-winning players
Tonnerre Yaoundé players
Ligue 1 players
Ligue 2 players
Valenciennes FC players
AS Monaco FC players
SC Bastia players
AS Saint-Étienne players
Montpellier HSC players
JS Saint-Pierroise players
Pelita Bandung Raya players
Expatriate footballers in France
Expatriate footballers in Monaco
Cameroonian expatriate sportspeople in France
Cameroonian expatriate sportspeople in Indonesia
Cameroon international footballers
Olympic footballers of Cameroon
Footballers at the 1984 Summer Olympics
1982 FIFA World Cup players
1990 FIFA World Cup players
1994 FIFA World Cup players
1982 African Cup of Nations players
1984 African Cup of Nations players
1986 African Cup of Nations players
1988 African Cup of Nations players
FIFA Century Club
Expatriate footballers in Réunion
Expatriate footballers in Indonesia
Chevaliers of the Légion d'honneur
Cameroonian expatriate sportspeople in Monaco
Cameroonian expatriate sportspeople in Réunion